Sinemys  is an extinct genus of turtle from the Late Jurassic to Early Cretaceous of China and Japan.  Three species have been named: S. lens, the type species, from the Kimmeridgian-Tithonian of Shandong; S. gamera (named after the movie monster of the same name), from the Valanginian-Albian of Nei Mongol; and S. wuerhoensis, from the Aptian-Albian of Xinjiang.

References

Further reading 
 Biology of Turtles by Jeanette Wyneken, Matthew H. Godfrey, and Vincent Bels

 

Cryptodira

Extinct turtles
Prehistoric turtle genera
Late Jurassic turtles
Early Cretaceous turtles
Late Jurassic genus first appearances
Early Cretaceous genus extinctions
Late Jurassic reptiles of Asia
Early Cretaceous reptiles of Asia
Fossils of China
Paleontology in Shandong
Taxa named by Carl Wiman
Fossil taxa described in 1930